The 2017 Toulon Tournament was an international association football tournament held in Bouches-du-Rhône, France. The twelve national teams involved in the tournament were required to register a squad of 20 players; only players in these squads were eligible to take part in the tournament.
Each squad was composed of Under-20 players. All ages as of start of the tournament.

Group A

Angola
Head coach:  Igor Lazik

Cuba
Head coach:  Raúl González Triana

England
Head coach:  Neil Dewsnip

England named a squad on 16 May. Subsequent to the announcement, Elliott Moore replaced Sadou Diallo of Manchester City, who withdrew injured, and Callum Slattery replaced Andre Dozzell of Ipswich Town who was removed from the squad to play for England under-19s. While it was officially considered an Under-20 side, the main England national under-20 football team was taking part in the 2017 FIFA U-20 World Cup at the same time.

Japan
Head coach:  Masanaga Kageyama

Group B

Bahrain
Head coach:  Samir Chammam

Ivory Coast
Head coach:  Soualiho Haïdara

France
Head coach:  Jean-Claude Giuntini

Wales
Head coach:  Rob Page

Group C

Brazil
Head coach:  Carlos Amadeu

Indonesia
Head coach:  Indra Sjafri

Czech Republic
Head coach:  Jan Suchopárek

Scotland
Head coach:  Scot Gemmill

References

Toulon Tournament squads
Squads